John R. Adler (born 1954) is an American neurosurgeon.

He was born in Yonkers, New York, in 1954. He graduated at Harvard College in 1976 and at Harvard Medical School in 1980. From 1980 to 1987 he did a neurosurgical residency at Massachusetts General Hospital and Brigham and Women's Hospital and a radiosurgery fellowship at the Karolinska Institute in Sweden, where he worked with Lars Leksell. He joined the faculty of Stanford University School of Medicine in 1987 as an assistant professor in the department of neurosurgery in 1987, was also, made an assistant professor in radiation oncology in 1992, was made an associate professor in both departments in 1993, and was made a full professor in both departments in 1998.  In 2007 he was named the Dorothy and Thye King Chan Professor in neurosurgery. He was eventually appointed an emeritus professor of neurosurgery.

In 1985 he did a one-year fellowship in Sweden with Lars Leksell, who had invented a device to deliver targeted radiation at brain tumors, called the Gamma Knife. He was astonished and inspired but saw an opportunity to improve it. The Gamma Knife relied on a physical cage to coordinate the location of the subject's head and the device delivering the radiation; Adler wanted to use medical images to guide the beam, instead of the cage. When he returned to Stanford he worked with faculty in the engineering school to build a prototype and by 1987 was pitching his company to venture capitalists.  They rejected his idea because the machines were enormous and expensive (the estimated price at that time was $3.5M), so he raised $800,000 from other neurosurgeons, friends, and family, and started a company, Accuray, in 1990.  Adler served as chief medical officer, remaining on the Stanford faculty.  The company ran out of money in 1994 and had other struggles; Adler took a leave of absence from Stanford in 1999 and took over as CEO, serving in that role until 2002, when he stepped back into being CMO. As of 2005, the company was selling about two machines each month.

In 2009, Adler founded Curēus.com (originally known as peerEmed.com), a web-based peer-reviewed medical journal that combines attributes of traditional expert review and social networks with the objective of fairly compensating reviewers and authors.

In April 2010, Adler was appointed vice president and chief of New Clinical Applications at Varian Medical Systems. Since 2015 he has served as the founder and CEO of Zap Surgical Systems. The company's flagship project was presented in Europe in 2018 at the  "Frontiers of Radiosurgery" scientific symposium and adopted for the first time in Europe in 2020.

In 2018 Adler was awarded the Cushing Award for Technical Excellence and Innovation in Neurosurgery, presented at the AANS Annual Scientific Meeting.

He is the father of Trip Adler, co-founder and CEO of Scribd.

Works

References

External links
 John R. Adler Profile at Stanford University

1954 births
Living people
American health care chief executives
American inventors
American neurosurgeons
Harvard College alumni
Harvard Medical School alumni
People from Yonkers, New York
Scientists from New York (state)
Stanford University School of Medicine faculty
American expatriates in Sweden